The Sri Lanka national cricket team toured Australia in the 1987-88 season and played 1 Test match against Australia.  This was the first time that Australia and Sri Lanka had played each other in Test cricket in Australia.

Test series summary

External sources
 CricketArchive

References
 Playfair Cricket Annual (annual)
 Wisden Cricketers Almanack (annual)

1987 in Australian cricket
1987 in Sri Lankan cricket
1987–88 Australian cricket season
1988 in Australian cricket
1988 in Sri Lankan cricket
International cricket competitions from 1985–86 to 1988
1987-88